Renwu District or Jenwu District is a district of Kaohsiung City in southern Taiwan.

History
After the handover of Taiwan from Japan to the Republic of China in 1945, Renwu was organized as a rural township of Kaohsiung County. On 25 December 2010, Kaohsiung County was merged with Kaohsiung City and Renwu was upgraded to a district of the city.

Geography
It has 95,309 inhabitants as of January 2023 and an area of 36.0808 km2.

Administrative divisions
The district consists of Dawan, Wannei, Kaotan, Wulin, Renfu, Renwu, Wenwu, Zhuhou, Bagua, Gaonan, Houan, Zhonghua, Wuhe, Renhe, Chishan and Renci Village.

Infrastructures
 Renwu Refuse Incineration Plant

Transportation
Renwu is served by National Freeway 1 and National Freeway 10, as well as Provincial Highway 1. Taiwan Railways Administration's Western Trunk line and Taiwan High Speed Rail both pass through Renwu, but no station is currently planned.

See also
 Kaohsiung

References

External links